The Hoofman Farmstead Barn is a historic barn in rural White County, Arkansas.  It is located north of Searcy, on the west side of Salem Church Road.  It is a stone structure,  stories in height, with a wood-frame gabled roof.  It is basically rectangular, with a stone shed-roof extension on one side, giving it a saltbox profile.  Built about 1920, it is the largest and possibly oldest historic stone structure in the county.  It was built to serve as a large root cellar.

The barn was listed on the National Register of Historic Places in 1992.

See also
National Register of Historic Places listings in White County, Arkansas

References

Barns on the National Register of Historic Places in Arkansas
Buildings and structures completed in 1920
Buildings and structures in White County, Arkansas
National Register of Historic Places in White County, Arkansas